Agalakuppa  is a village in the southern state of Karnataka, India. It is located in the Nelamangala taluk of Bangalore Rural district in Karnataka.

See also
 Bangalore Rural
 Districts of Karnataka

References

External links
 https://bangalorerural.nic.in/en/

Villages in Bangalore Rural district